The 2002 All Thailand Golf Tour was the fourth season of the All Thailand Golf Tour, the main professional golf tour in Thailand since it was established in 1999.

Schedule
The following table lists official events during the 2002 season.

Notes

References

All Thailand Golf Tour
All Thailand Golf Tour